Frank-Olaf Schreyer is a German mathematician, specializing in algebraic geometry and algorithmic algebraic geometry.

Schreyer received in 1983 his PhD from Brandeis University with thesis Syzgies of Curves with Special Pencils under the supervision of David Eisenbud. Schreyer was a professor at University of Bayreuth and is since 2002 a professor at Saarland University.

He is involved in the development of (algorithmic) algebraic geometry advanced by David Eisenbud. Much of Schreyer's research deals with syzygy theory and the development of algorithms for the calculation of syzygies.

In 2010 he was an invited speaker (jointly with David Eisenbud) at the International Congress of Mathematicians in Hyderabad. In 2012 he was elected a Fellow of the American Mathematical Society.

Selected publications
 
 
 
with D. Eisenbud, H. Lange, G. Martens: The Clifford dimension of a projective curve, Compositio Math., vol. 72, 1989, pp., 173–204
A standard basis approach to syzygies of canonical curves, J. reine angew. Math., vol. 421, 1991, pp. 83–123
as editor with Klaus Hulek, Thomas Peternell, Michael Schneider: Complex Algebraic Varieties, Lecture Notes in Mathematics, Springer Verlag 1992 (Konferenz Bayreuth 1990)
Geom., vol. 2, 1993, pp. 185–237
with K. Ranestad: Varieties of sums of power, Journal für die reine und angewandte Mathematik, 2000, pp. 147–181
with David Eisenbud: Sheaf Cohomology and Free Resolutions over Exterior Algebras, Arxiv 2000
with W. Decker: Computational Algebraic Geometry Today, in: C. Ciliberto et al. (eds.), Application of Algebraic Geometry to Coding Theory, Physics and Computation, Kluwer 2001, pp. 65–119 
with D. Eisenbud, J. Weyman: Resultants and Chow forms via exterior syzygies, Journal of the American Mathematical Society, vol. 16, 2003, pp. 537–579
with D. Eisenbud, G. Fløystad: Sheaf cohomology and free resolutions over exterior algebras, Transactions of the American Mathematical Society, vol. 355, 2003, pp. 4397–4426, Arxiv
as editor with Alicia Dickenstein, Andrew J. Sommese: Algorithms in Algebraic Geometry, Springer 2008
with D. Eisenbud: Betti numbers of graded modules and cohomology of vector bundles, Journal of the American Mathematical Society, vol. 22, 2009, pp. 859–888
with David Eisenbud: Betti Numbers of Syzygies and Cohomology of Coherent Sheaves, ICM 2010, Hyderabad, Arxiv
with Burcin Erocal et al.: Refined Algorithms to Compute Syzygies, J. Symb. Comput., vol. 74, 2016, pp. 308–327, Arxiv

References

Living people
20th-century German mathematicians
21st-century German mathematicians
Brandeis University alumni
Academic staff of the University of Bayreuth
Academic staff of Saarland University
Algebraic geometers
Fellows of the American Mathematical Society
Year of birth missing (living people)